Katalin Zsilák (born 15 September 1989 in Békéscsaba) is a Hungarian handballer who plays for Békéscsabai Előre NKSE in right wing position.

Achievements
Magyar Kupa:
Silver Medalist: 2012
Bronze Medalist: 2010

External links
 Katalin Zsilák player profile on Békéscsabai Előre NKSE Official Website
 Katalin Zsilák career statistics at Worldhandball

References

1989 births
Living people
People from Békéscsaba
Hungarian female handball players
Békéscsabai Előre NKSE players
Sportspeople from Békés County
21st-century Hungarian women